Laroni Gallishaw (born April 4, 1981) is a former American football defensive back. He played for the Minnesota Vikings in 2005.

References

1981 births
Living people
Sportspeople from Lakeland, Florida
Players of American football from Florida
American football defensive backs
Louisville Cardinals football players
Murray State Racers football players
Minnesota Vikings players